Perfect Strangers is a 1984 erotic thriller film directed by Larry Cohen. It stars Anne Carlisle and Brad Rijn and Ann Magnuson.

Plot
A Mafia hit man discovers a young boy has witnessed him killing someone. Under Mafia pressure he is urged to kill the boy but is picked up by the boy's mother and soon they fall into a relationship.

Cast
 Anne Carlisle as Sally
 Brad Rijn as Johnny
 John Woehrle as Fred
 Matthew Stockley as Matthew
 Stephen Lack as Lieutenant Burns
 Ann Magnuson as Malda

References

External links
 
 
 
 

1984 films
1984 thriller films
1980s English-language films
1980s erotic thriller films
American erotic thriller films
Films directed by Larry Cohen
Films with screenplays by Larry Cohen
New Line Cinema films
1980s American films